Akkaraipattu (Tamil: அக்கரைப்பற்று, Sinhala: අක්කරපත්තුව) is a large town in the Ampara District, Eastern Province, Sri Lanka. The town is strategically located with links via the Siyambalanduwa-Ampara Road (A25) and the Colombo-Batticaloa highway (A4).

History
During the period of British rule, Akkaraipattu was within the Batticaloa District. A Government Agent headed each district. The posts of Maniyakkara (Assistant Government Agent) and Vanniyanar (Additional Government Agent) reported to the Government Agent.. The Vanniyanar appointed two officers directly responsible for irrigation, development, and education. Under this structure, agriculture and road construction became a prominent part of the development of the Akkaraipattu area. The Vanniyanar was also responsible for appointing the chairman and members of local government organizations who would then conduct the functions of a local council including collecting taxes, civic construction, and maintaining law and order. The construction of the Gal Oya scheme, which commenced in 1949 and continues to be improved upon, further established agriculture—particularly paddy and sugar cane—as a driving economic force. Road development also continued in parallel with the development of land for agriculture.  

The Urban Development Area of Akkaraipattu includes Akkaraipattu Municipal Council and includes 23 Grama Niladhari Divisions (GND) of Akkaraipattu Municipal Council and five GNDs from the Pradeshiya Sabha area. (A GND is the smallest administrative unit in government.)

Geography
The town is located just south of the centre of the eastern coastline and can be found through the Siyambalanduwa - Damana - Ampara Road (A25) and the Colombo-Ratnapura-Wellawaya-Batticaloa Road (A4).

Topography
The terrain has large areas that are generally level and covered with agriculture. Settlements are scattered throughout the area.

Soil types
The susceptibility of soil types to drought is a major concern in Akkaraipattu. The three main soil types in this area are: alluvial soil which has variable drainage and texture, reddish-brown soil, and Solonetz soil. The alluvial soil is generally found on flat flood plains. Poorly drained alluvial soil is grey in colour whilst soil with better drainage is coloured brown to yellowish brown. The reddish brown soil has a reddish-brown surface colour when dry and turns to a dark reddish-brown colour when wet. Solonetz soil is not a fertile soil because it has a pH value greater than 8.5.

Hydrology
Akkaraipattu has three major water tanks: Ilukkuchchenai Tank, Neethai Tank, and Thillai Aru. These tanks, combined with water catchment systems, assist in supporting the paddy cultivation in the area.

Climate
Akkaraipattu is located in the dry zone of Sri Lanka. The northeast monsoon period (October–February) has the highest monthly rainfall. Conversely, the dry season months of June, July, and August have the lowest rainfall. The seasonal rain provides for the cultivation of crops during the maha season. The lowest number of thundering days are recorded during the months of January and February whilst the highest number of days are recorded in September and October, prior to the commencement of the monsoon season.

An AusAID/UN-Habitat analysis of temperature records for the years 1950–2010 reports that the highest temperatures are experienced in May, June, and July (around ). The lowest temperatures are recorded in the months of January and December (around ).

Demographics
Akkaraipattu urban area is dominated by Muslims. There are also Buddhist, Hindus and Christian minorities living in the town. The majority of people in Akkaraipattu speak Tamil, with Sinhala also spoken.

Religion 
Source:statistics.gov.lk

Education

Aalayadivaembu Tamil School 
Akkaraipattu Muslim Central College
Ak/Sri Dhammarathanana Sinhala Vidyalaya
Al-Badur School
Al-Fathimiya School
Al-Hidaya School
Al-Kamar Vidyalaya
Al-Munawwara College
Ar-Raheemiya School
As-Siraj Maha Viddiyalaya
Ayesha Muslim Ladies College
Dr. Badi Ud Din Mahmud School
Fayiza Maha Vidayalayam
Govt. Muslim Boys Vidyalaya (GMBV)
Hijra School
Ilukkuchenai Al-Hudha Vidyalaya
Kathiriya Vidyalaya
Kolaavil Tamil Vidyalaya
Murawodai Shamsul Uloom Vidyala
RKM Tamil Vidyalaya 
Segu Sikkanthar Oliullah Vidyalaya
Sri Rama krishna National College Tamil 
Sir Razeek Fareed Vidyalaya
Vivekananthair Tamil Vidyalaya
Zahira Vidyalaya.

Economy
Akkaraipattu acts as an agro-economic hub. Vast extents of Paddy field surround the township.

References

External links

Towns in Ampara District
Akkaraipattu DS Division